Uromastyx nigriventris, the Moroccan spiny-tailed lizard, is a species of agamid lizard. It is found in Morocco and Algeria.

References

Uromastyx
Reptiles described in 1912
Taxa named by Walter Rothschild
Taxa named by Ernst Hartert